Okechukwu Ibeanu is a Professor of Political Science and was also Dean, Faculty of the Social Sciences at the University of Nigeria, Nsukka. He was also special rapporteur of the United Nations Human Rights Council on the adverse effects of illicit movement and dumping of toxic waste on human rights.

Professor Ibeanu was previously programme officer of the MacArthur Foundation overseeing its human rights and Niger Delta programmes. A former Fellow of the United Nations University, Tokyo, he has also been a visiting scholar at Queen Elizabeth House, Oxford University, and the Woodrow Wilson Center, Washington D.C.

Professor Ibeanu sits on the boards of many research institutions including the Centre for Democracy and Development. He has published extensively on the Niger Delta and Nigerian politics in general, including Civil Society and Conflict Management in the Niger Delta (2005). His latest book titled Oiling Violence (2006) is on the proliferation of small arms and light weapons in the Niger Delta.

As of 2016 Okechukwu Ibeanu has officially been titled one of the commissioners of the Independent National "INEC" Electoral Commission. He is officially the commissioner of the Southeast section of Nigeria.

See also
 United Nations special rapporteur

References

External links
Profile at the Conflict, Security & Development Group, King's College London

United Nations special rapporteurs
Living people
Academic staff of the University of Nigeria
Nigerian officials of the United Nations
Year of birth missing (living people)